Thomas Stockdale (died 1653) was a Parliamentarian and MP for Knaresborough.

Thomas Stockdale may also refer to:
 Thomas Minshull Stockdale, English barrister and landowner
Thomas Stockdale (MP for Appleby), represented Appleby (UK Parliament constituency) 1413 and 1417
T. R. Stockdale (Thomas Ringland Stockdale, 1828–1899), American politician